Ispanakhi Matsvnit is a Georgian salad dish composed of cooked and minced spinach mixed with yoghurt. Garlic, salt and cilantro are added as flavouring to the dish while preparing.

See also

 Green sauce
 Salsa verde
 Tzatziki

References

Cuisine of Georgia (country)
Salads
Spinach dishes